Statistics of Ekstraklasa for the 1951 season.

Overview
12 teams played in the league and Wisła Kraków finished in the first position and became the league champion. In the 1951 season, the Ekstraklasa was not a competition for the title of the Polish Champion. Before the season Polish Football Association decided that Champion of Poland title will be awarded to the winner of the Polish Cup, which was later Ruch Chorzów.

League table

Results

Top goalscorers

References

External links
Poland – List of final tables at RSSSF 

Ekstraklasa seasons
1
Pol
Pol